Kebler Pass (el. 10,007 ft.) is a high mountain pass in Colorado.

The Colorado Department of Transportation refers to the traversing road as Gunnison County Road (GCR) 12.  The eastern terminus of GCR 12 is Crested Butte.  At its western terminus, GCR 12 intersects State Highway 133 near the southern end of Paonia State Park.  It is a mostly gravel road and is closed during the winter months. A few portions of the road near the top of the pass have been paved. In the summer, the road is accessible by all passenger vehicles.

 

Mountain passes of Colorado
Landforms of Gunnison County, Colorado